Ornipholidotos ugandae is a butterfly in the family Lycaenidae. It is found in Cameroon, Equatorial Guinea, the Republic of the Congo, Gabon, Angola, the Central African Republic, the Democratic Republic of the Congo, Uganda and Tanzania. The habitat consists of forests.

The larvae feed on lichens, preferring smaller varieties on dead twigs and fallen logs.

Subspecies
 Ornipholidotos ugandae ugandae (north-eastern Democratic Republic of the Congo, Uganda, north-western Tanzania)
 Ornipholidotos ugandae biokoensis Libert, 2005 (Equatorial Guinea)
 Ornipholidotos ugandae goodi Libert, 2000 (Cameroon, Congo, Gabon, Angola, Central African Republic, Democratic Republic of the Congo)

References

Butterflies described in 1947
Ornipholidotos